Little Buddy Doyle (born March 20, 1911; died c. 1960) was an American Memphis blues and country blues guitarist, singer and songwriter. He was a working associate of the harmonica players Big Walter Horton and Hammie Nixon, the guitarist David "Honeyboy" Edwards, and the pianist Sunnyland Slim.

Life and career
He was born Charley Doyle in Cordova, Tennessee. During the 1930s, he performed regularly on Beale Street, in Memphis, Tennessee.

It is generally accepted that Horton made his first recording backing Doyle on eight songs recorded in Memphis for Okeh Records and Vocalion Records in 1939. Doyle, who was known locally for often suffering the effects of moonshine, jimson weed or other intoxicants, included the lines "my mind in such a condition till I hardly know the days of the week" on the track "Bad in Mind Blues". Doyle also recorded with Nixon around the same time; some of their recorded work remains unissued.

Most of what else is known about Doyle derives from the autobiography of Edwards, who met him in Memphis in 1935, where Doyle regularly performed in Handy Park. He was still performing in Handy Park when Edwards returned to Memphis in 1943, at which time Edwards sometimes performed in the park with Doyle, Horton and the young Little Walter. Edwards remembered Doyle clearly and described him as a charismatic figure. According to Edwards, Doyle was a red-eyed alcoholic, was drunk all the time and had two or three gold teeth. His nickname, Little Buddy, was likely due to his diminutive stature; according to Edwards, Doyle "was a midget. His legs was so short that when he sat on the bench to play the guitar he couldn´t pat his feet. He had to just bump against the seat, his feet would be that far off the ground. He´d get to playing the blues and just bump, bump, bump."

When Edwards met him in 1935, Doyle was married to Hedda, who was six feet tall. According to Edwards, Hedda too was "a good guitar player in the key of G." She sometimes performed with Doyle.

Little else is known of Doyle's life apart from his recorded work. Details of his death seem to be undocumented, but it is known he died in Bolivar, Tennessee, around 1960.

See also
List of country blues musicians
List of Memphis blues musicians

Discography
Doyle's known tracks include "Bad in Mind Blues"; "Grief Will Kill You", "Hard Scufflin' Blues", "Lost Baby Blues", "Renewed Love Blues", "She's Got Good Dry Goods", "Slick Caper Blues", "Sweet Man Blues" and "Three Sixty Nine Blues".  Several are featured on the following compilation albums.

References

External links
 Illustrated Little Buddy Doyle discography

1911 births
1960s deaths
Year of death missing
American blues guitarists
American blues singers
American male guitarists
Country blues musicians
Memphis blues musicians
People from St. Francis County, Arkansas
Songwriters from Arizona
Songwriters from Arkansas
Singers from Arizona
Singers from Arkansas
Guitarists from Arizona
Guitarists from Arkansas
20th-century American guitarists
People from Cordova, Tennessee
20th-century American singers
20th-century American male singers
American male songwriters